Ameiva provitaae is a species of teiid lizard endemic to Venezuela.

References

Ameiva
Reptiles described in 1995
Lizards of South America
Reptiles of Venezuela
Taxa named by Juan Elías García-Pérez